The KTFF 50th Anniversary Cup was a football tournament held under the auspices of the NF-Board. It celebrated 50 years of the Cyprus Turkish Football Federation.

History
The KTFF and featured representative sides from the host nation, the Sápmi and Kosovo. Northern Cyprus triumphed in a round-robin tournament.

Squads

Kosovo

Coach:  Muharrem Sahiti

Table and results

Table

Results

See also
Non-FIFA football

References

External links
KTFF 50th Anniversary Cup at RSSSF

Non-FIFA football competitions
2005–06 in European football
2005 in Northern Cyprus
Football competitions in Northern Cyprus
Northern Cyprus national football team
Kosovo national football team
Sápmi football team